Cepharanthine is an antiinflammatory and antineoplastic compound isolated from Stephania. Due to these modalities, it has been shown effective against HTLV in lab research.  Additionally, it has successfully been used to treat a diverse range of medical conditions, including radiation-induced leukopenia, idiopathic thrombocytopenic purpura, alopecia areata, alopecia pityrodes, venomous snakebites, xerostomia, sarcoidosis, refractory anemia and various cancer-related conditions. No safety issues have been observed with CEP, and side effects are very rarely reported.

References 

Benzylisoquinoline alkaloids
Anti-inflammatory agents